Limni is a village of the Volvi municipality. Before the 2011 local government reform it was part of the municipality of Arethousa, of which it was a municipal district. The 2011 census recorded 232 inhabitants in the village. Limni is a part of the community of Skepasto. The village is built on the foot of mountain Kerdilia which separates the regional unit of Thessaloniki from the regional unit of Serres. The origin of most of the inhabitants are Pontic Greek. They have settled in the area in 1922 coming from the Black Sea area.

See also
 List of settlements in the Thessaloniki regional unit

References

Populated places in Thessaloniki (regional unit)